Bernard Kusi (born 1 June 1939) is a Ghanaian former footballer. He competed in the men's tournament at the 1968 Summer Olympics.

References

External links
 

1939 births
Living people
Ghanaian footballers
Ghana international footballers
Olympic footballers of Ghana
Footballers at the 1968 Summer Olympics
Footballers from Kumasi
Association football defenders
Asante Kotoko S.C. players